Kvasyunino is a rural locality (a village) in Sizemskoye Rural Settlement, Sheksninsky District, Vologda Oblast, Russia. The population was 115 as of 2002.

Geography 
Kvasyunino is located 58 km north of Sheksna (the district's administrative centre) by road. Koposikha is the nearest rural locality.

References 

Rural localities in Sheksninsky District